Two Upbuilding Discourses (1844) is a book by Søren Kierkegaard.

History
Kierkegaard wrote the Eighteen Upbuilding Discourses during the years of 1843–1844. These discourses were translated from Danish to English in the 1940s, and from Danish to German in the 1950s, and then to English again in 1990. These Discourses were published along with Kierkegaard's pseudonymous works.

Scholars generally say that "Kierkegaard's books were of two kinds. There was a series of books ascribed to pseudonyms, which Kierkegaard described as "aesthetic" in character. In Either/Or, Fear and Trembling, and Repetition, Kierkegaard explores the nature of human passions in a variety of forms, often presenting his own experiences in a poetically disguised narrative". The pseudonymous books as well as his discourses are understood to be directed to the love of his life, Regine Olsen. "He hoped to reveal himself at last to Regine in this "indirect" manner. At the same time that these aesthetic writings were being published, Kierkegaard wrote a series of edifying, sermon like essays, although he was careful to insist that they were not sermons, in part because he had not been ordained and therefore lacked "authority." Through these he communicated his underlying religious commitments in a more "direct" fashion. Kierkegaard continued to write these "edifying discourses" throughout his life, but as he grew older they focused on more distinctively Christian themes and took on a decidedly sharper tone."
 
Kierkegaard says individuals are "squeezed into the forms of actuality" but that they have a choice as to what form they will put on. He says "the transition made in Either/Or is substantially that from a poet-existence to an ethical existence.

He "held out Either/Or to the world in his left hand, and in his right he held the Two Edifying Discourses; but all, or as good as all, grasped with their right what he held in his left hand. Kierkegaard wrote in 1848, “I had made up my mind before God what I should do: I staked my case on the Two Edifying Discourses; but I understood perfectly that only very few understood them. And here for the first time comes in the category ‘that individual' who with joy and gratitude I call my reader.’ A stereo typed formula which was repeated in the Preface to every collection of Edifying Discourses. Now he holds out these two discourses of 1844 with his right hand and hopes for better results. He says in his dedication to "that single individual', Although this little book (which is called “discourses’, not sermons, because its author does not have authority to preach; “upbuilding discourses,” not discourses for upbuilding, because the speaker by no means claims to be a teacher) has left out something, it nevertheless has forgotten nothing; although it is not without hope in the world, it nevertheless totally renounces all hope in the uncertain or of the uncertain. Tempted, perhaps, as the earlier ones were not, it takes no delight in “going to the house of feasting,” desires as little as they “that its visit might be in vain” (I Thessalonians 2:1); even though a person was not without education insofar as he learned from what he suffered, it still would never be very pleasant if he needed to suffer much in order to learn little. Its desire is to give thanks if on the word of authority it were to win the tacit permission of the multitude to dare to go its way unnoticed in order to find what it seeks: that single individual whom I with joy and gratitude call my reader, who with the right hand accepts what is offered with the right hand; that single individual who at the opportune time takes out what he received and hides what he took out until he takes it out again and thus by his good will, his wisdom, invests the humble gift to the benefit and joy of one who continually desires only to be as one absent on a journey. S.K. Eighteen Upbuilding Discourses, Hong Preface p. 179

How can we learn from what we suffer? Kierkegaard said, "it is Governance that has educated me." This would mean Divine Governance since he capitalized the word. His works lead a person from being governed by everything that happens to him to one who can choose how he is going to govern himself. Kierkegaard wrote in Works of Love "You have to do only with what you do unto others, or how you take what others do unto you. The direction is inward; essentially you have to do only with yourself before God. This world of inwardness, this rendition of what other people call actuality, this is actuality. The Christian like for like belongs to this world of inwardness." We can learn through the application of patience.

Every individual is equal because every individual has a choice, an eternal soul, expectations of faith and love and patience. All of these inner goods are "good and perfect gifts from God". And the knowledge that you need God is the all important gift from God according to Kierkegaard. These two discourses deal with patience. Kierkegaard says each person must be involved in forming his own personality. The individual must be patient in her expectations.

Structure 

These two discourses are the only discourses of his eighteen discourses that lack a dedication to his father. Perhaps it was dedicated to his mother Ane since it deals with keeping expectation alive even when suffering loss and Ane lost five of her seven children.

Luke 2:33-40 "And his father and his mother marveled at what was said about him; and Simeon blessed them and said to Mary his mother, "Behold, this child is set for the fall and rising of many in Israel, and for a sign that is spoken against (and a sword will pierce through your own soul also), that thoughts out of many hearts may be revealed." And there was a prophetess, Anna, the daughter of Phan'u-el, of the tribe of Asher; she was of a great age, having lived with her husband seven years from her virginity, and as a widow till she was eighty-four."Would you rather," She did not depart from the temple, worshiping with fasting and prayer night and day. And coming up at that very hour she gave thanks to God, and spoke of him to all who were looking for the redemption of Jerusalem. And when they had performed everything according to the law of the Lord, they returned into Galilee, to their own city, Nazareth. And the child grew and became strong, filled with wisdom; and the favor of God was upon him." The Bible (RSV)

His Two Upbuilding Discourses of 1844:
 To Preserve One's Soul in Patience, Luke 21.19, "By your endurance you will gain your lives." The Bible (RSV)
 Patience in Expectation, Luke 2:33-40

To Preserve One's Soul in Patience 
Kierkegaard stressed the value of patience in expectancy when facing life situations in these two short essays.

He says to the single individual, "You may have heard how someone who had thoughtlessly frittered away his life and never understood anything but wasted the power of his soul in vanities, how he lay on his sick bed and the frightfulness of disease encompassed him and the singularly fearful battle began, how he then for the first time in his life understood something, understood that it was death he struggled with, and how he then pulled himself together in a purpose that was powerful enough to move the world, how he attained marvelous collectedness for wrenching himself out of the sufferings in order to use the last moment to catch up on some of what he had neglected, to bring order to some of the chaos he had caused during a long life, to contrive something for those he would leave behind. You may have heard it from those who were there with him, who with sadness, but also deeply moved, had to confess that in those few hours he had lived more than in all the rest of his life, more than is lived in years and days as people ordinarily live."

He provides examples of how different people react to danger and anxiety. He regards the single individual very highly and says, "Let us praise what is truly praiseworthy, the glory of human nature; let us give thanks that it was granted also to us to be human beings."

Kierkegaard provides three examples of people reacting to anxiety and despair, all of them as praiseworthy as the physical endurance to defeat an external enemy. Both have been important factors since the publication of Either/Or. he writes,

One person "surveyed everything and the horrifying situation, how quickly presence of mind assuredly chose the right thing as if it were the fruit of the most mature reflection, how the will, even the eyes, defied the threatening terrors, how the body did not even feel the exertion, the agonizing suffering, how the arms lightly carried the burden that far exceeded human strength, how the feet stood firm where others did not dare to look down because they saw the abyss!"

While another "person discovered a danger while all speak of peace and security, if he discerned the horror and after having used the healthiest power of his soul to make himself fully aware of it, again with the horror before his eyes, now developed and preserved the same strength of soul as the one who fought in peril of his life, the same inwardness as the one who fought with death-yes, then we shall praise him."

Another "with troubled imagination conjured up anxieties he was unable to surmount, while he still could not leave off staring at them, evoking them ever more alarmingly, pondering them ever more fearfully, then we shall not praise him, even though we praise the wonderful glory of human nature. But if he brought out the horror and detected the mortal danger, without any thought of providing people, by pointless talk, with subject matter for pointless pondering, but grasped that the danger had to do with himself-if, then, with this in mind, he won the strength of soul that horror gives, this would in truth be praiseworthy, would in truth be wondrously wonderful."

This act of self-discovery is the essence of what Kierkegaard wrote about. He says, "People are prone to pay attention to earthly dangers but these are external dangers. Kierkegaard says, we need to preserve something internal; our souls." He explains himself, Just as there is only one means for preserving it, so is this means necessary even in order to understand that it must be preserved, and if this were not the case, the means would not be the only means. This means is patience. A person does not first gain his soul and then have the need for patience to preserve it, but he gains it in no other way than by preserving it, and therefore patience is the first and patience is the last, precisely because patience is just as active as it is passive and just as passive as it is active. Eighteen Upbuilding Discourses, Hong p. 187

There are two paths people take in life. The path of patience or the path of impatience. Kierkegaard puts it so well, 

Does not patience perceive that the greatest danger is that the elucidating understanding’s fears prove not to be the case, for then not even patience could comfort anymore? Now it can, if only the sick one so desires, since the danger is whether the sick one is to be allowed to emancipate himself from the eternal, to wither away in commonsensicality, to expire in callousness, to be desouled in spiritlessness. And against this danger there is still a resource. He who, believing, continues to aspire to the eternal never becomes satiated in such a way that he does not continue blessedly to hunger; he who hopefully looks to the future can never be petrified at some moment by the past, because he always turns his back to it; he who loves God and human beings still continually has enough to do, even when need is the greatest and despair is most imminent. Before he lies down to die, he asks once again: Do I love God just as much as before, and do I love the common concerns of human beings? If he dares to answer in the affirmative, then he does not die or he dies saved; if he dare not, then he certainly has enough to do. Then in love and for the sake of his love he must deliberate whether it is not possible to see, to glimpse, to presage the joy and comfort that still must hide in the sadness, since this must still truly serve him for good. Eighteen Upbuilding Discourses p. 198-199

Patience in Expectation 

Kierkegaard's intention in the preceding discourse was to speak as if patience were outside a person. He says, "we are well aware that this is not so. And nevertheless I ask you, you who know better how to praise it than I, know better how to accomplish the good, how to commend it to people, since you have known it better, more inwardly and for a longer time-was it nevertheless not so at times, when concern and your laboring thoughts piled up deliberations that were of no benefit except to give birth to new deliberations, that then the plain, simple, but nevertheless forgotten words of patience prodded you from another direction, was it not as if patience stool on the outside? We have made it appear as if patience were outside, and we have let it speak, as it were, for itself."

Now he brings out a real person, just as he did in Either/Or (A and B), in Fear and Trembling (Abraham), and in Repetition (the Young Man and Constantin Constanius). He brings out Anna and focuses primarily on her and her expectancy. What he drives home is that God is the constant that remains the same, whereas everything else changes. What he exhorts us to is to love God in such a way that our nature might be like his, that we might gain God in constancy and rescue our soul in patience.

What is it about expectancy that it either blesses or curses the single individual? Kierkegaard says, "How often it is said that no one is to be considered happy until he is dead, but how seldom is a troubled person heard to say that one should not give up as long as one is living, that there is hope as long as there is life-and consequently there is always hope for the immortal who expect an eternity." His advice to the person who believes that their past life has destroyed all expectancy is to: “Forget the past once again, quit all this calculating in which you trap yourself, do not stop the prompting of your heart, do not extinguish the spirit in useless quarreling about who waited the longest and suffered the most-once again cast all your sorrow upon the Lord and throw yourself upon his love. Up out of this sea, expectancy rises reborn again and sees heaven open-reborn, no newborn, for this heavenly expectancy begins precisely when the earthly expectancy sinks down powerless and in despair.”

But the expectant person should always remember that "every time he catches his soul not expecting victory, he knows he does not have faith." Anna had a choice, the same as everyone has, and used it. Kierkegaard says,

Criticism 
These upbuilding discourses were translated edifying discourses by David F. Swenson when he translated them in the mid-1940s. He wrote the following in his preface to this discourse. "The discourses appearing in the present volume constitute the fourth and fifth groups in the series of eighteen devotional addresses, and both groups were published in 1844. It may be of some interest to consider more particularly than has hitherto been done, the plan and purpose of these productions, paralleling as they do in time of publication the publication of the esthetic works. Unlike the latter, these addresses were published under Kierkegaard's own name, because as religious works he assumed personal responsibility for the views expressed, since their purpose was to indicate that from the beginning his writing had a religious motivation and plan, of which the esthetic works were also a part."

Swenson is echoing Kierkegaard's own thoughts here. He wrote the following in Concluding Unscientific Postscript to Philosophical Fragments, That Either/Or ends precisely with the upbuilding truth (yet without so much as italicizing the words, to say nothing of didacticizing) was remarkable to me. I could wish to see it emphasized more definitely in order that each particular point on the way to existing Christian-religiously could become clear. The Christian truth as inwardness is also upbuilding, but this by no means implies that every upbuilding truth is Christian; the upbuilding is a wider category. I now concentrated again on this point, but what happened? Just as I intended to begin, Two Upbuilding Discourses by Magister Kierkegaard, 1843, was published. Then came three upbuilding discourses, and the preface repeated that they were not sermons, which I, if no one else, would indeed have unconditionally protested against, since they use only ethical categories of immanence, not the doubly reflected religious categories in the paradox. If a confusion of language is to be averted, the sermon must be reserved for religious-Christian existence. p. 256
 
And again in The Point of View of My Work as an Author,“The first group of writings represents aesthetic productivity, the last group is exclusively religious: between them, as the turning-point, lies, the Concluding Postscript. This work concerns itself with and sets ‘the Problem’, which is the problem of the whole authorship, how to become a Christian. So it takes cognizance of the pseudonymous work, and of the eighteen edifying discourses as well, showing that all of this serves to illuminate the Problem-without, however, affirming that this was the aim of the foregoing production, which indeed could not have been affirmed by a pseudonym, a third person, incapable of knowing anything about the aim of a work that was not his own. The Concluding Postscript is not an aesthetic work, but neither is it in the strictest sense religious. Hence it is by a pseudonym, though I add my name as editor-a thing I did not do in the case of any purely aesthetic work.” p. 13

David J. Gouwens, Professor of Theology at Brite Divinity School, reminds the reader that Kierkegaard was always more interested in the "how" than in the "why". He says, because the “how” is central to Kierkegaard, we must attend closely not only to the pseudonymous literature that has received the bulk of scholarly attention, but also to the series of upbuilding and edifying discourses published currently with the pseudonymous literature. Robert L. Perkins has helpfully termed Kierkegaard’s “second authorship,” with respect to the straightforward religious literature published (with some exceptions) under Kierkegaard’s own name after Concluding Unscientific Postscript (1846).  It was the edifying discourses in his right hand and his pseudonymous writing in his left, and the public accepted with its right hand the pseudonymous literature in his left, and in its left hand the edifying discourses literature in his right. Although there have been a number of fine studies in recent years that attend to the second literature, there is room for further reflection on the inner logic and character of the upbuilding and “second literature.” This study is an attempt to contribute to that reflection. What lies behind this is a conviction that finally, the audience Kierkegaard’s literature addresses consist of not simply, or even first of all, philosophers or literati (whether of 19th-century Denmark or today) but persons attempting to be human beings and, perhaps Christians.

Mankind has many different conceptions of what the soul is but one thing they all agree on is that every single individual has a soul and Kierkegaard's view of the matter is that since everyone has a soul all are equal. Is the Russian soul different from the Greek soul or from Hegel's soul or W. E. B. Du Bois's or is the soul equivalent to the mind or to the world?

Everyone wants to think about it but Keirkegaard wanted to act on a presupposition that there is a soul living inside himself and his job was to preserve it. He says, Impatience is an evil spirit that can be expelled only by prayer and much fasting. … the hunger of impatience is not easy to satisfy-how, then, through fasting? The demands of impatience certainly use many words and long speeches, but in prayer it is very sparing with words. Temporal patience has provisions on hand for a long time, doggedly perseveres, seldom rests, never prays, but Anna continued night and day. Even though impatience says that it is no art to pray-oh, just to collect one’s mind in prayer at a specific time and to pray inwardly, even though for only a moment, is more difficult than to occupy a city, to say nothing of persevering night and day and persevering in prayer in inwardness of heart and the presence of mind and the quietness of thought and the sanction of the whole soul, without being scattered, without being disturbed, without repenting one’s devotion, without anguishing about its being a prinked-up deception, without becoming sick of all one’s praying-but Anna, serving the Lord with prayer and fasting night and day, did not leave the temple. Eighteen Upbuilding Discourses p. 223

Kierkegaard wrote the following in an earlier discourse, 

He explained the problem people have in loving human beings in his Journals, 

In Either/Or he says, 

Howard V. Hong says in the introduction to his translation of the discourses, "According to the usual ways of reckoning the impact of a book-reviews and sales-the six small volumes of upbuilding discourses were scarcely a smashing success. ... The sales of the six volumes matched the paucity and brevity of the reviews of the discourses. ... when [Kierkegaard] ran out of the first two discourses, he  bound the sixteen discourses in a volume under the common title Sexten opyggelige Taler (Sixteen Upbuilding Discourses). ... 78 copies of the two discourses (1843 and 61 copies of the three discourses (1843) were remaindered, a copy of Sexten opyggelige Taler must be the rarest Kierkegaard book in existence. ... they and later discourses were obliged to wait a hundred years for the acclaim given to them by Martin Heidegger.

Swenson wrote in 1941, "While Kierkegaard has long been recognized in continental Europe as one of the world's foremost thinkers, it is only recently that he is coming to be known by the English-reading public. His first work to be translated into English, the Philosophical Fragments, appeared only five years ago. Since then some eight or ten of his more important books have been published in English, with a prospect for more in the future. As a result of this tardy recognition, English interpretations of Kierkegaard's thought and commentaries concerning it, have been practically non-existent, a condition which is bound to alter rapidly as he becomes better known, since his ideas are not only thought-provoking but frequently controversial in content.

Notes

References

Sources

Primary sources 
 Eighteen Upbuilding Discourses, by Søren Kierkegaard, Princeton University Press. Hong, 1990
 Edifying Discourses, by Søren Kierkegaard, Vol. III, Translated from the Danish by David F. Swenson and Lillian Marvin Swenson, Augsburg Publishing House, Minneapolis, Minnesota, 1945
 Søren Kierkegaard: Papers and Journals, translated with and introduction and notes by Alistair Hannay, 1996, Penguin Books
 Either/Or Volume I Edited by Victor Eremita, February 20, 1843, translated by David F. Swenson and Lillian Marvin Swenson Princeton University Press 1971
 Either/Or. Part II Translated by Howard and Edna Hong. Princeton, 1988, 
 Concluding Unscientific Postscript to Philosophical Fragments Volume I, by Johannes Climacus, edited by Søren Kierkegaard, Copyright 1846 – Edited and Translated by Howard V. Hong and Edna H. Hong 1992 Princeton University Press
 The Point of View of My Work as An Author: A Report to History, by Søren Kierkegaard, written in 1848, published in 1859 by his brother Peter Kierkegaard Translated with introduction and notes by Walter Lowrie, 1962 Harper Torchbooks

Secondary sources 
 Something about Kierkegaard, By David F. Swenson, Mercer University Press, 2000, originally published 1941 and 1945, Augsburg Publishing House
 Kierkegaard as religious thinker By David J. Gouwens, Cambridge University Press, 1996
 

Books by Søren Kierkegaard
1844 books